Malvern Link is an area of Malvern, Worcestershire, England to the north and east of Great Malvern. The centres of Malvern Link and Great Malvern are separated by Link Common, an area of open land that is statutorily protected by the Malvern Hills Conservators. In 1900 Malvern Link Urban District, which had been formed only five years earlier, merged with Great Malvern to become Malvern Town. The population of Link in 2011 was 6,155.

Location
The main urban area is to the north of the Worcester Road and the Link Common that marks a sharply defined boundary on the south of the settlement between the railway station and the area's western limit at Newtown Road in Link Top. The urban development takes a gentle transition through  the neighbourhoods of Upper Howsell and Lower Howsell to the farms and communities of Leigh Sinton in the north and Newland and Madresfield in the west. To the south along the main axis of Pickersleigh Road, an unbroken built up area merges seamlessly into Barnards Green, a suburb of the former independent town of Great Malvern.

History
The name Malvern Link seems to have been in use for some time: "The many local placenames ... which first appear in thirteenth century records were probably current a full century earlier. ... By 1276 ... there was, therefore, a probable population of at least 200 scattered in the old hamlets of Baldenhall, Guarlford, Poolbrook and the Link ..."
Malvern Link was the key site of the Romano-British pottery industry that produced Severn Valley Ware. There are several kilns in the Malvern Link-Newland area and numerous water-filled clay pits, now lined with trees.

The ancient name "Link" refers to a ridge in the slope of the Malvern Hills on which it is situated, from the Middle English "hlinc" meaning a ridge of land, or a hill.  The word  "link" can also  mean  "Rising ground; a ridge, a bank."(compare with "helling" meaning "slope" in Dutch, and in German the more specialised "slipway")

A popular folk tale about the origin of the name is that it arose because the Victorians used to link up more horses to the carriages so that they could be pulled up the hill on the A449, which runs through the centre of Malvern Link to the small urban centre of Link Top at its western end before arriving in the town centre of Great Malvern. At the point where the A449 road passes through Malvern Link it is called Worcester Road, as it leads directly into the centre of the city of Worcester about eight miles to the east.

The Link Stone
A perambulation of the boundaries of the Malvern Chase in 1584 describes "a great Stone in a Tufte of bushes" at Link Top which was recorded on a Stuart map as the "Whore Stone" (meaning hoar or ancient stone).
In 1744 the Link Stone was located at the beginning of Pickersleigh road. It has since been relocated to the St Matthias churchyard.

An inscription on a plaque near the stone reads:-

This stone originally marked the boundary between the Manors of Leigh and Powick. It was already old in 1584 when a breathless Elizabethan gentleman noted it during "beating the bounds". In the Stuart period it was marked on an estate map as the "Old Stone". The central recess is a receptacle for coins perpetuating the very old custom of receiving payment for the right of passage through the parish. This custom was acknowledged by mourners, who would rest a coffin on the Link Stone on its way to Leigh from the Pickersleigh side  of the Link, a practice probably not discontinued until 1846 when St Matthias was consecrated.

Development
Malvern Link is the location of the majority  of Malvern's council  and private housing  estates, and retail parks and factory  centres that have emerged since the 1950s. The expansion  in  the second half of the 19th  century began essentially as ribbon  development  along  the Worcester Road, the eastern approach  to  Malvern, at the same time as Malvern's rise to  popularity  as a Spa Town. When the railway  arrived in  the mid 19th  century, the settlement had reached sufficient dimensions to  justify  its own fully  featured station although the Great Malvern station is only  about  one mile further down the line.  Large villas and small  hotels were constructed along  the entire length  of the northern side of the Worcester Road, from the railway  station  to  Link Top affording  them an unhindered view over the Malvern Common and many  of them  were converted to  boarding  schools following the decline of the spa industry,  and major middle class residential  areas developed northwards during  the inter-war years of the 1920s and 1930s.

Further development is planned for the second decade of the 21st century with approximately 700 new houses, 10 hectares of employment land, a primary school and community centre destined for former farm land between Malvern Link and Newland. This will effectively merge the two villages into the urban sprawl of Malvern Link, creating new neighbourhoods that  have yet  to  be named. A new community hospital  for Malvern on the site of Seaford Court, a former private prep school in  Malvern Link, close to  the station,  was opened in  2011.

Population
As with the rest of Malvern, the Link owes much of its development to the area's rapid expansion from a cluster of hamlets and manors to a busy spa town during the mid 19th century. In  1942 the population swelled again when the Telecommunications Research Establishment (TRE) relocated to Malvern to occupy a site at Barnards Green, and a further site of the RAF Radio Training School on the location of the former Pale Manor Farm  in Leigh Sinton Road in Malvern Link, that came to be known as RRE North Site.

Governance
Malvern Link constitutes the major part  of the Link ward of the civil parish governed by Malvern Town Council (returning 4 councillors to the Town Council) and the same ward is also used to return 3 councillors to Malvern Hills District Council. The ward includes all of Malvern Link from Link Top  in  the west  to  the Newland roundabout  in  the east except a small  part of the Malvern Link area in  the west that  is allocated to  Dyson Perrins ward. The area of  Malvern Link also includes part of  the Pickersleigh  ward to  the south and also includes the former settlements of Upper Howsell and Lower Howsell.

Industry and commerce

Malvern Link is home to the Morgan Motor Company, a manufacturer of luxury sports roadsters,  and Chance Brothers, the remaining  factory of what  was once the largest  manufacturer of glassware in  the United Kingdom. Malvern's fire station is on Worcester Road in Malvern Link.

The main shopping area of Malvern Link stretches along the Worcester Road in from the junction of Spring Lane to the junction of Pickersleigh Road at the Malvern Link railway station. It contains all the retail outlets common to a small  town including pharmacies, furniture and dry goods stores, supermarkets, hardware stores, gardening centres, banks, betting shops, groceries, butchers, and cafés and fast-food,  and a former cinema that is now a furniture warehouse.  A mural on the Pickersleigh Road wall of the Victoria pharmacy depicts many of Malvern's landmarks, including the hills, Edward Elgar and Link Stone, which now resides in the churchyard of nearby St Matthias Church. It also contains the opening line (in Latin) of Psalm 121, 'I will lift up mine eyes unto the hills', the so-called 'Malvern Psalm'.

A retail park (the Malvern Hills Retail Park) has been in  constant  development of Malvern Link since the mid-1990s, with stores that  include the branches of national  chains such  as Boots, Morrisons, Marks & Spencer, Matalan, Next and Halfords. The retail  park is an extension  of  the Spring  Lane trading estate, a commercial  park  of small modern factories, warehouses and service providers, that began its development in the early 1960s.

Transport

Rail
Malvern Link railway station is located in  Worcester Road, and provides direct services to Worcester, Hereford, Gloucester, Birmingham,  Oxford, London Paddington and Bristol.

Bus
Several local bus services connect Malvern Link with the surrounding area including the 42, S42 operated by Astons coaches stopping in Barnards Green bus shelter. Serving  areas further afield are: 
the  Malvern to  Worcester route 44, 44A, 44B operated by First Diamond serving stops  at  the  Barnards Green bus shelter and Pound Bank; The Worcester - Upton-upon-Severn - Malvern route 362/363 operated by Diamond serves that stops at  the Barnards Green bus shelter  and the Malvern - Gloucester - Cheltenham route 377 (Saturdays only) operated by  Diamond, stopping at  the Court Road shops and the Barnards Green bus shelter.

Sport
The playing fields at Victoria Park provide children's "safe" play areas. The main football pitch was replaced in 2021 by a state of the art Basketball Court. One football pitch remains and both Malvern Rugby Club and Barnards Green Cricket Club are  a very short distance away.

Air
The nearest major airport is Birmingham which is accessible by train via Birmingham New Street and then 10 minutes further on a London Euston train, or trains travelling in the  direction.

Birmingham International Airport is assumed to be approximately one hour by road via the M5 and M42 motorways. Gloucestershire Airport located at Staverton, in the Borough of Tewkesbury near Malvern is a busy General Aviation airport used mainly for private charter and scheduled flights to destinations such as the islands of Jersey, Guernsey and the Isle of Man, pilot training, and by the aircraft of emergency services.

Education
One of Malvern's two secondary schools, Dyson Perrins CE Sports College, is located in Malvern Link. The school was endowed by and is named after Charles William Dyson Perrins, grandson of the co-founder of Lea and Perrins, the manufacturer of the local product Worcestershire sauce that is sold worldwide. The area also has several primary schools (such as Somers Park Primary School and St. Matthias C of E Primary School). The location  of the former independent boys boarding  school Seaford Court, is the site of a new Malvern community hospital that  was opened in   2010.

Notable residents

Edward Elgar, composer. On  returning  from  London to  settle in  the Malverns, in 1891 Elgar and his wife leased a semi-detached house at 37 Alexandra Road, Malvern Link, which they named 'Forli'.
They  lived in  the house until 1898, when the Elgars moved to  Storridge.

References

External links 
Vision of Britain

Geography of Worcestershire